Marnie Simpson (born 17 January 1992) is an English television personality. She appeared on the MTV reality series Geordie Shore. In 2016, she finished in fourth place on the eighteenth series of Celebrity Big Brother, and appeared on the eighth series of Ex on the Beach.

Career
Simpson joined Geordie Shore in 2013, she had previously appeared in a club scene from series 1 in episode 4. Simpson left the series in 2015 at the end of the eleventh series, but returned in the twelfth series. In 2016, she took part in the eighteenth series of Celebrity Big Brother where she finished in fourth place. In 2017, she returned to Big Brother 18, as a special guest for a shopping task. Simpson also took part in series eight of Ex on the Beach. Later in 2017, she released her own range of contact lenses, under the brand 'I Spy Eyes'. In 2019, Simpson began starring in the MTV series Geordie Shore OGs, a spinoff series of Geordie Shore.

Personal life
Before appearing on Geordie Shore, Simpson was a runner-up in Miss Newcastle, and she worked as a waitress. She was previously engaged to then boyfriend Ricky on Season 11 of Geordie Shore, but then broke it off & returned to the show in Season 12. Her cousin is a fellow Geordie Shore cast member, Sophie Kasaei. In April 2019, she announced that she was pregnant, and 29 October 2019, she gave birth to her son, Rox Starr Johnson with partner Casey Johnson. They have a second son, Oax Rubee Johnson, born in May 2022.

Filmography

References

External links

1992 births
Living people
Bisexual women
Geordie Shore
English bisexual people
People from South Shields
Big Brother (British TV series) contestants
Television personalities from Tyne and Wear